John King Luttrell (June 27, 1831 – October 4, 1893) was an American miner, lawyer and politician who served three terms as a U.S. Representative from California from 1873 to 1879.

Early life and career 
Born near Knoxville, Tennessee, Luttrell attended the common schools. He moved with his parents to a farm in Alabama in 1844. He moved to Missouri in 1845 with his parents, who settled on a farm near St. Joseph. He moved to California in 1852 and engaged in mining.

He settled in Yolo County and engaged in agricultural pursuits. He moved to Prairie City (later Folsom) in 1853, to El Dorado County in 1854 and thence to Watsonville in Santa Cruz County, and to Alameda County. He studied law. He was admitted to the bar and commenced practice in Oakland in 1856. He was a Justice of the Peace in Brooklyn (now a part of Oakland) in 1856 and 1857. He moved to Siskiyou County in 1858 and purchased a ranch near Fort Jones. He engaged in agricultural pursuits, mining, and the practice of law.

He was sergeant at arms of the California State Assembly in 1865 and 1866.
He again served as a member of the Assembly in 1871 and 1872.

Congress 
Luttrell was elected as a Democrat to the Forty-third, Forty-fourth, and Forty-fifth Congresses (March 4, 1873 – March 3, 1879). He declined to be a candidate for reelection.

Later career and death 
He resumed the practice of law, farming, and mining. He served as member of the board of state prison directors from 1887 to 1889. He was appointed United States Commissioner of Fisheries and special agent of the United States Treasury for Alaska in 1893.

He died in Sitka, Alaska at age 62, and was interred in Fort Jones Cemetery, Fort Jones, California.

References

1831 births
1893 deaths
Democratic Party members of the United States House of Representatives from California
Democratic Party members of the California State Assembly
California lawyers
American miners
Farmers from California
People from Siskiyou County, California
Politicians from Knoxville, Tennessee
Politicians from St. Joseph, Missouri
19th-century American politicians
Farmers from Tennessee
19th-century American lawyers